Sembawang Bus Interchange is a bus interchange located in Sembawang, Singapore. Opened on 20 November 2005, it provides hassle-free transfer to the nearby Sembawang MRT station.

This is one of the interchanges in a residential estate to not have any feeder services.

History
Before the opening of Sembawang Bus Interchange, various bus services terminated at scattered parts of Sembawang town. These include Admiralty Road West Bus Terminal for Service 980, Sembawang Road End Bus Terminal (near Sembawang Park) for Service 167 and the pair of bus stops outside Sembawang MRT station for Service 981.

When the bus interchange opened, these bus services, along with Service 859, which operated from Yishun Bus Interchange, were amended to terminate at the newly opened bus interchange. A replacement bus service, Service 882, was created to replace the lost link between Sembawang and Sembawang Park along Sembawang Road End via Wellington Circle and Montreal Link. Services to the former Admiralty Road West Bus Terminal from Sembawang were covered by Service 856, which passes by both places along its route between Yishun Bus Interchange and Woodlands Regional Bus Interchange, and bus Service 981, which passes by both place on its route to Senoko Industrial Estate. There are only two new bus services in Sembawang after that, which is service 117 to Punggol and 883 to Yishun.

Management 
Since 3 October 2021, Sembawang Bus Interchange is managed by Tower Transit on a five year term.

Bus Contracting Model

Under the new bus contracting model, with the exception of Service 117 under Sengkang-Hougang Bus Package, the rest of the services are under Sembawang-Yishun Bus Package.

References

External links

 Interchange/Terminal (SMRT Buses)
 Sembawang Town Map & Services Guide

2005 establishments in Singapore
Bus stations in Singapore
Sembawang